Franklin Lenard Johnson (born November 23, 1958) is an American former professional basketball player and coach. He played ten seasons in the National Basketball Association (NBA) for the Washington Bullets, Houston Rockets and Phoenix Suns.

Playing career
In high school, he played basketball for the Lake Weir Hurricanes. During his junior year in 1974–1975, he was a star for the 33–0 Hurricanes team that won Marion County’s first state championship. He played collegiately for Wake Forest University, becoming an All-American selection in 1980–81. He was inducted into the school’s hall of fame in 1998. Johnson was selected in the first round of the 1981 NBA draft with the 11th pick by the Washington Bullets. He played point guard in the NBA for the Bullets (1981–1988), the Houston Rockets (1988–89) (he signed as a free agent with the New Jersey Nets, but they traded him to the Rockets before he played in any games for them).  He also played for the Phoenix Suns (1992–94) where his main role was to relieve star Kevin Johnson. He was selected from the Rockets by the Orlando Magic in the 1989 expansion draft, but was waived before the 1989–90 season started. He played 650 games in the NBA (regular season and playoffs), with regular season career averages of 8.3 PPG and 4.2 APG in 21.6 minutes.

He played professionally in Italy for Ranger Varese (1989–91, played in the finals of the Italian Championship in 1990) and Marr Rimini (Serie A2, 1991).

Head coaching record

|-
| style="text-align:left;"|Phoenix
| style="text-align:left;"|
|31||11||20|||| align="center"|6th in Midwest|||—||—||—||—
| style="text-align:center;"|Missed playoffs
|-
| style="text-align:left;"|Phoenix
| style="text-align:left;"|
|82||44||38|||| align="center"|4th in Midwest|||6||2||4||
| style="text-align:center;"|Lost in First Round
|-
| style="text-align:left;"|Phoenix
| style="text-align:left;"|
|21||8||13|||| align="center"|(fired)|||—||—||—||—
| style="text-align:center;"|—
|- class="sortbottom"
| style="text-align:left;"|Career
| ||134||63||71|||| ||6||2||4||||

Personal life
Frank earned his nickname “Fourth Quarter Frank” for his clutch performances helping the team grind out close games.

Family
Johnson's brother "Fast Eddie" also played in the NBA. He spent more than eight seasons with the Atlanta Hawks, and closed out his career with stints in Cleveland and Seattle. Eddie was a two-time (1980, 1981) All-Star while with the Hawks.

References

1958 births
Living people
African-American basketball coaches
African-American basketball players
American expatriate basketball people in France
American expatriate basketball people in Italy
American men's basketball coaches
American men's basketball players
Basketball coaches from Florida
Basketball players from Florida
Basket Rimini Crabs players
Houston Rockets players
Orlando Magic expansion draft picks
People from Marion County, Florida
Phoenix Suns assistant coaches
Phoenix Suns head coaches
Phoenix Suns players
Point guards
Wake Forest Demon Deacons men's basketball players
Washington Bullets draft picks
Washington Bullets players
21st-century African-American people
20th-century African-American sportspeople